Tan Sri Abdul Rahman bin Hashim (7 July 1923 – 7 June 1974) was a Malaysian police officer who served as the third Inspector-General of Police from February 1973 to his assassination in June 1974. He served as the Deputy Inspector-General of Police from January 1972 to February 1973.

Police career
Chief Sub Inspector - 17 October 1941
Probationary Inspector - 1 April 1946
Baling District Police Chief - January 1948
Criminal Investigating Officer in Kajang (Insp.) - May 1949
Kulai District Police Chief, Johor - January 1952
3 month Criminal Investigation Department course at Mill Mecee Stafford, United Kingdom. Returned and worked at the Kuala Lumpur Special Branch - 21 April 1953
Head Coach at the Special Branch Training School - 16 March 1954
Course at Rynston on Dunsmore or Bramshill Police Colege, United Kingdom - 22 September 1957
Head of Penang Special Branch - 1960
Deputy Director of Special Branch - 1963
Director of Special Branch - 1971
Deputy Inspector General of Police - 31 January 1972
Inspector General of Police on 1 February 1973 until the date of his death on 7 June 1974

Assassination
On 7 June 1974, he was shot dead by communist subversives in Kuala Lumpur. Wild rumours associated the shooting to a succeeding IGP but the matter was not proven and remain unknown.

Service Ribbon

Honours
  : 
 Member of the Order of the Defender of the Realm (AMN) (1961)
  : 
 Recipient of the Malaysian Commemorative Medal (Silver) (PPM) (1965)
 Companion of the Order of the Defender of the Realm (JMN) (1968)
 Commander of the Order of the Defender of the Realm (PMN) – Tan Sri (1974)
  :
 Companion of the Exalted Order of the Crown of Kedah (SMK)
 Knight Commander of the Exalted Order of the Crown of Kedah (DPMK) – Dato'

Commonwealth Honours
 :
 Recipient of the Colonial Police Medal (CPM) (1957)

Foreign Honours
 :
 Knight Grand Cross of the Order of the Crown of Thailand (GCCT) (1974-posthumously)

References 

1923 births
1974 deaths
Deaths by firearm in Malaysia
Malaysian police chiefs
People from Kedah
Malaysian people of Malay descent
Malaysian Muslims
Male murder victims
People murdered in Malaysia
Malaysian police officers
Members of the Order of the Defender of the Realm
Companions of the Order of the Defender of the Realm
Commanders of the Order of the Defender of the Realm
1974 murders in Malaysia
Recipients of the Colonial Police Medal